The 1925 Southern Illinois Maroons football team was an American football team that represented Southern Illinois Normal University (now known as Southern Illinois University Carbondale) in the Illinois Intercollegiate Athletic Conference (IIAC) during the 1925 college football season.  In its 9th season under head coach William McAndrew, the team compiled a 0–5–1 record, failed to score a point, and was outscored by a total of 31 to 0. The loss to Will Mayfield College was a forfeit resulting from confusion as to the date of the game.  The team played its home games at Normal Field in Carbondale, Illinois.

Schedule

References

Southern Illinois
Southern Illinois Salukis football seasons
College football winless seasons
Southern Illinois Maroons football